Sharon Valley may refer to:

Sharon Valley, California
Sharon Valley, Connecticut
 Sharon Valley, Israel